Baudette International Airport  is a county-owned public-use airport located one mile (2 km) north of the central business district of Baudette, a city in Lake of the Woods County, Minnesota, United States. Also known as Baudette International Airport & Seaplane Base, it is located on the Rainy River, which is the border between Minnesota in the U.S. and Ontario in Canada.

Facilities and aircraft 
It has one runway designated 12/30 with a 5,499 x 100 ft (1,676 x 30 m) asphalt surface. The airport also has a seaplane landing area designated 13W/31W and measuring 6,000 x 1,200 ft (1,829 x 366 m) which is located on Rainy River. It shares its airspace and waterway with neighboring Rainy River Water Aerodrome in Canada.

For the 12-month period ending January 30, 2012, the airport had 12,825 aircraft operations, an average of 35 per day: 94% general aviation, 5% air taxi and 1% military. At that time there were 11 aircraft based at this airport: 15 single-engine, 1 multi-engine, 1 ultralight.

References

External links 

 

Airports in Minnesota
Seaplane bases in the United States
Buildings and structures in Lake of the Woods County, Minnesota
Transportation in Lake of the Woods County, Minnesota
Binational airports